Bolyu is one of the unrecognized ethnic groups in China. 
Bolyu language (also known as Paliu, Palyu, or Lai 俫语, 徕语) is an Austroasiatic language of the Pakanic branch (Sidwell 1995). It is unwritten and moribund.

Further reading
Jiang Jun [蒋俊]. 2005. Ethnic group and nation in the village vision: Field research about Lai people [村落视野中的族群与民族：关于俫人的田野研究]. M.A. dissertation, Guangxi Normal University. http://www.docin.com/p-380721709.html

Ethnic groups in China
Guangxi
Ethnic groups in Yunnan